Börü (formerly known as Armyanskiye Borisi,) is a village and the least populous municipality in the Goranboy District of Azerbaijan. The village had an Armenian majority prior to the First Nagorno-Karabakh War and Operation Ring.

References

External links 
 

Populated places in Goranboy District